Theodore Stephen Hamerow (August 24, 1920 – February 16, 2013) was a Polish-born American historian, focusing on modern history, especially German history of the 19th and 20th century.

Born to Jewish parents in Warsaw, Hamerow moved via France to the United States with his family in 1930. He earned his bachelor's degree from City College of New York in 1942, followed by a master's from Columbia University in 1947. In 1951, he earned his doctorate under supervision of Hajo Holborn at Yale University.

Hamerow was a professor of German history at the University of Illinois at Urbana–Champaign from 1952 to 1958, before joining faculty at the University of Wisconsin–Madison, where he taught until 1991.

Hamerow died in Madison, Wisconsin, in 2013.

Selected works
 Restoration, Revolution, Reaction: Economics and Politics in Germany, 1815–1871 (1958)
Social Foundations of German Unification, 1858–1871, 2 vols. (1969–72)
(ed.), The Age of Bismarck: Documents and Interpretations (Harper/Evanston, New York, NY/London 1972)
Reflections on History and Historians (1987)
On the Road to Wolf's Lair: German Resistance to Hitler (1997)
Why We Watched: Europe, America, and the Holocaust (2008)

Further reading
 Theodore S. Hamerow, Remembering a Vanished World. A Jewish Childhood in Interwar Poland (2001)
 Andreas Daum, "Refugees from Nazi Germany as Historians: Origins and Migrations, Interests and Identities", in The Second Generation: Émigrés from Nazi Germany as Historians. With a Biobibliographic Guide, ed. Daum, Hartmut Lehmann, James J. Sheehan. New York: Berghahn Books, 2016, 1‒52.

References

External links

1920 births
2013 deaths
Writers from Madison, Wisconsin
American people of Polish-Jewish descent
Polish emigrants to the United States
City College of New York alumni
Columbia University alumni
Yale University alumni
University of Illinois Urbana-Champaign faculty
University of Wisconsin–Madison faculty